Imidazolidinyl urea is an antimicrobial preservative used in cosmetics . It is chemically related to diazolidinyl urea which is used in the same way. Imidazolidinyl urea acts as a formaldehyde releaser.

Safety 

Some people have a contact allergy to imidazolidinyl urea causing dermatitis. Such people are often also allergic to diazolidinyl urea.

Chemistry 

Imidazolidinyl urea was poorly characterized until recently and the single Chemical Abstracts Service structure assigned to it is probably not the major one in the commercial material. Instead, new data indicate that the hydroxymethyl functional group of each imidazolidine ring is attached to the carbon, rather than on the nitrogen atom:

Synthesis 

Imidazolidinyl urea is produced by the chemical reaction of allantoin and formaldehyde in the presence of sodium hydroxide solution and heat. The reaction mixture is then neutralized with hydrochloric acid and evaporated:

2  + 3 H2C=O → 

Commercial imidazolidinyl urea is a mixture of different formaldehyde addition products including polymers.

References 

Preservatives
Disinfectants
Ureas
Hydantoins